East Meets West Music (EMWMusic) is the official recording label of the Ravi Shankar Foundation. The label was launched in 2010, with the first release scheduled for Ravi Shankar's ninetieth birthday on April 7, 2010.

Catalog
 Raga reissue: Released 2010.
 Tenth Decade In Concert: Live in Escondido:  Released 2012.
 The Living Room Sessions Part 1: Released 2012.
 The Living Room Sessions Part 2: Released 2013.
 UTSAV Series:  Released 2013.
 Arghyam – The Offering
  Raga & Raj

References

External links
 Launch announcement on CNNGO.com.
 http://www.eastmeetswestmusic.com/
 EMWMusic's official site
 Ravi Shankar Foundation
 Anoushka Shankar

American independent record labels
Indie rock record labels